Starfire II is a 1980 board wargame published by Task Force Games.

Gameplay
Starfire II is a game involving space ship-to-ship battles.

Reception
Stefan Jones reviewed Starfire II in The Space Gamer No. 35. Jones commented that "Despite its flaws, I recommend Starfire II. It is quick-playing and fun."

Reviews
Dragon #47 (March 1981)
Dragon #59
Ares Magazine #8

References

Board games introduced in 1980
Task Force Games games